Glyphostoma lyuhrurngae is a species of sea snail, a marine gastropod mollusk in the family Clathurellidae.

Description
The size of an adult shell varies between 17 mm and 25 mm.

Distribution
This species occurs in the East China Sea and in the Pacific Ocean along the Philippines

References

External links
 

lyuhrurngae
Gastropods described in 2005